Lay It Down is the second studio album by Contemporary Christian musician Jennifer Knapp. It was released on February 29, 2000 by Gotee Records. The album was nominated for "Best Rock Gospel Album" at the 43rd Grammy Awards in 2001. It peaked at No. 1 on Billboards Top Christian Albums chart on March 17, 2000 and No. 77 on the Billboard 200 chart.

Critical reception

Writing for AllMusic, Steve Losey comments, "On her second release Lay It Down, Knapp shows the kind of artistic growth expected from a seasoned veteran. One minute it's Carole King in a coffe shop courtesy of 'A Little More,' The next you're tapping your toe to a snappy Sheryl Crow vibe on 'Lay It Down.' This disc is rich in texture and lyrically passionate."

Ryan B Key reviews the album for Jesus Freak Hideout and gives it 4½ out of a possible 5 stars. He writes, "Lay it Down is an album that showcases the true meaning of Christian rock music and some of Knapp's best songwriting to date." He concludes his review by saying, "Lay it Down is an excellent album featuring some of the best songwriting available, Christian or secular."

Paul Nicholls of Cross Rhythms gives this album a 10 out of a possible 10 and concludes his review with, "My verdict? Excellent, well worth a play and a privilege to listen to."

Track listing

 Musicians 
 Jennifer Knapp – vocals, acoustic guitar (1, 2, 3, 7, 8, 10), electric guitar (6)
 David Alan – Hammond B3 organ (4, 6), Wurlitzer electric piano (5)
 Larry Hall – melodica (7)
 George Coccini – electric guitar (1), acoustic guitar (1)
 Mark Townsend– electric guitar (1), acoustic guitar (1, 5, 7, 8, 9)
 Tyler Burkum – electric guitars (2, 3, 4, 6), baritone guitar (3)
 Chris Thile – mandolin (8, 9)
 Tony Lucido – bass (1-8)
 Greg Herrington – drums (1-4, 6, 8, 9), programming (4, 8), percussion (7)
 Todd Collins – drum programming (5)
 Javier Solis – percussion (1, 4, 6, 7, 8)
 Mark Stuart – percussion (2)
 Margaret Becker – backing vocals and arrangements (9)Nashville String Machine (Tracks 1 & 6)'
 Tom Howard – arrangements and conductor (1, 6)
 Carl Gorodetzky – contractor 
 Pamela Sixfin – string leader
 John Catchings and Bob Mason – cello
 Jack Jezzro – double bass 
 Jim Grosjean, Gary Vanosdale and Kristen Wilkinson – viola 
 David Angell, David Davidson, Gerald Greer, Alan Umstead, Catherine Umstead, Mary Kathryn Vanosdale and Karen Winkelmann – violin

Production 
 Toby McKeehan – executive producer 
 Mark Stuart – producer 
 Jennifer Knapp – producer 
 Mike McGlaflin – A&R 
 Brad Talbott – design 
 Kerri McKeehan-Stuart – photography 
 Steven Thomas – management 
 Recorded at Castle Studios (Nashville, Tennessee) and Dark Horse Studios (Franklin, Tennessee).
 Mixed at The Sound Kitchen (Nashville, Tennessee)

Track information and credits verified from the album's liner notes.

Charts

References

2000 albums
Jennifer Knapp albums
Gotee Records albums